Jonathan Clegg (born 14 July 1989) known as Jono Clegg is a British rower who competed at the 2016 Summer Olympics. Clegg competed at the 2013 World Rowing Championships in Chungju, where he won a bronze medal as part of the lightweight coxless four with Adam Freeman-Pask, Will Fletcher and Chris Bartley. The following year he competed at the 2014 World Rowing Championships in Bosbaan, Amsterdam, where he won a bronze medal as part of the lightweight coxless pair with Sam Scrimgeour.

Two years later he was selected for the British Olympic team and competed in the men's lightweight coxless four event with Chris Bartley, Mark Aldred and Peter Chambers finishing in seventh place.

References

External links
 

1989 births
Living people
British male rowers
Olympic rowers of Great Britain
Rowers at the 2016 Summer Olympics
Place of birth missing (living people)